Lord Donaldson could refer to:

Jack Donaldson, Baron Donaldson of Kingsbridge
John Donaldson, Baron Donaldson of Lymington